Qeshlaq-e Hezarat Qoli may refer to:
Qeshlaq-e Hezarat Qoli Abdollah
Qeshlaq-e Hezarat Qoli Abu ol Hasan
Qeshlaq-e Hezarat Qoli Bakhtiar
Qeshlaq-e Hezarat Qoli Gholam